Diedrich is both a masculine German given name and a German surname. Notable people with the name include:

Given name
Diedrich Bader (born 1966), American actor, voice actor and comedian
Diedrich A. Bohlen (1827–1890), German-born American architect
Diedrich Diederichsen (born 1957), German writer, music journalist and cultural critic
Diedrich Henne (1834–1913), German-born Australian botanist
Diedrich Hermann Westermann (1875–1956), German missionary, Africanist and linguist
Diedrich Téllez (born 1984), Nicaraguan footballer
Diedrich Uhlhorn (1764–1837), German engineer
Diedrich Wattenberg (1909–1996), German astronomer
Diedrich Willers Jr. (1833–1908), American politician

Surname
Friedrich Diedrich (1935–2015), German Roman Catholic theologian
John Diedrich, Australian actor, director and producer

See also
Diedrich Coffee, an American coffee company

German masculine given names